Maroneia-Sapes is a municipality in the Rhodope regional unit, East Macedonia and Thrace, Greece. The seat of the municipality is the town Sapes. The municipality has an area of 641.751 km2.

Municipality
The municipality Maroneia-Sapes was formed at the 2011 local government reform by the merger of the following 2 former municipalities, that became municipal units:
Maroneia
Sapes

References

External links

Municipalities of Eastern Macedonia and Thrace
Populated places in Rhodope (regional unit)